Pyae Lyan Aung is a Burmese professional footballer who plays as a goalkeeper for J3 League side YSCC Yokohama, having played for the Myanmar national football team and Yadanarbon F.C. previously. In 2021, he fled to Japan, where on 12 August, the Japanese government decided to grant him refugee status, citing a strong fear that he would be persecuted if he returned to Myanmar.

References

External links
Profile

1993 births
Living people
Sportspeople from Mandalay
Burmese footballers
Yadanarbon F.C. players
Myanmar international footballers
Association football goalkeepers
Burmese expatriates in Japan